Sky 3D was a 3D television channel on the Sky platform, that launched on 6 September 2011 with the film Winx Club 3D: Magical Adventure. The channel broadcasts a mixture of movies, entertainment and sport for 12 hours a day from 01:00 pm to 01:00 am GMT.

History
On 11 January 2016, Sky 3D modified the logo to conform to the British TV channel of the same name.

From 8 to 16 October 2016 the channel was entirely dedicated to 3D cinema to remember the ancient films of the history of cinema in 3D.

In December 2017, Sky announced that the channel will only be available on demand from January 2018. The dedicated Sky 3D TV channel closed on 15 January 2018 and programming will only be available on Sky On Demand.

Programming 
The programs of entertainment are:
Britney Spears's Femme Fatale Tour
Bugs!
The ancient civilizations
Giuseppe Verdi's Falstaff
Kylie Minogue's Aphrodite - Les Folies Tour 2011
The Looney Tunes Show
Wonders of the world in 3D
The Seven Wonders of the solar system (History production)
National parks of the United States
Peter Gabriel - New Blood
The Reef - The Great Barrier Reef
Travel around the world
William e Kate - The wedding in 3D
Meerkats - The sentinels of the desert (National Geographic Channel production)
Titanic in 3D: the documentary
X Factor 5: The finals
The films are:
Animals United
Avatar
A Turtle's Tale: Sammy's Adventures
Cars 2
Garfield's Pet Force
Gnomeo and Juliet
The Hole
OceanWorld 3D
Piranha 3D
Pirates of the Caribbean: On Stranger Tides
Priest
Tangled
Call of the Wild
Sanctum
Saw 3D
Shrek Forever After
Space Dogs
StreetDance 3D
Step Up 3D
Toy Story 3
Tron Legacy
Winx Club 3D: Magical Adventure
The programs of sport are:
Serie A
Roma - Juventus
Milan - Inter
Roma - Lazio
Juventus-Inter
Inter - Milan
UEFA Champions League:
Manchester City - Napoli
Napoli - Bayern Monaco
Milan - Barcellona
Arsenal - Milan
Bundesliga:
Werder Brema - Amburgo
Premier League:
Manchester United - Chelsea
Manchester City - Everton
Tottenham Hotspur - Arsenal
Manchester UTD - Manchester City
Chelsea - Arsenal
Tottenham Hotspur - Manchester United
Manchester City - Chelsea
Chelsea - Tottenham Hotspur
La Liga
Darts:
World Darts Championship
Basketball:
NCAA Championship
Duke - North Carolina
2012 Final Big East
Rugby
Six Nations
Extreme sport:
ESPN Summer X Games Highlights
High Octane (AXN production)
Tennis:
US Open
Wimbledon

References

External links
 

Defunct television channels in Italy
Sky 3D
Sky Italia
Italian-language television stations
Television channels and stations established in 2011
Television channels and stations disestablished in 2018
2011 establishments in Italy
2018 disestablishments in Italy